= Blue China =

Blue China can refer to:

- Republic of China (1912–1949), as of 1928
- Republic of China, commonly known as "Taiwan" after 1949
- Nationalist government
- Kuomintang
